The State Bureau of Surveying and Mapping, or the National Bureau of Surveying and Mapping, was the central agency that was responsible for surveying and mapping in the People's Republic of China (PRC). It was established in 1959 and was made defunct in March 2018. It was affiliated with the Chinese Academy of Surveying and Mapping (CASM).

In January 2018, a rule was introduced stating that all maps had to be approved by the State Bureau of Surveying and Mapping prior to publishing, republishing, import or export. This rule affects maps printed in the PRC but for a foreign audience. In March 2018, the 13th National People's Congress announced that the newly formed Ministry of Natural Resources shall replace the functions of the Ministry of Land & Resources, State Oceanic Administration and the State Bureau of Surveying and Mapping.

See also
 (List of) national mapping agencies
 Restrictions on geographic data in China

References

External links 
 Official website 
 Chinese Academy of Surveying and Mapping

National mapping agencies
Geography of China
1959 establishments in China
Government agencies of China
Government agencies established in 1959
Censorship in China